is a Japanese professional wrestler currently working in the Japanese promotion Actwres girl'Z where she is the current AgZ Champion in her first reign.

Professional wrestling career

Independent circuit (2017–present)
During her career, Aono often made freelance work by competing in various promotions from the Japanese independent scene. At 2AW Grand Slam In 2AW Square, an event promoted by Active Advance Pro Wrestling on March 28, 2021, she teamed up with Tae Honma and unsuccessfully challenged 3A (Ayame Sasamura and Rina Shingaki) for the World Woman Pro-Wrestling Diana Tag Team Championship. At DDT Ganbare Pro Home Alone, an event promoted by Ganbare Pro-Wrestling on December 25, 2021, Aono teamed up with Yuna Manase and Yuuri in a losing effort against harukaze, Misa Matsui and Moeka Haruhi. At Oz Academy I See The Light on December 30, 2021, she teamed up with Kakeru Sekiguchi and Misa Matsui in a losing effort against Ozaki-gun (Mayumi Ozaki, Saori Anou and Yumi Ohka).

Actwres girl'Z (2017–present)
Aono is probably best know for her tenure with Actwres girl'Z, promotion in which she made her professional wrestling debut on June 25, 2017, at AgZ Act 21 where she fell short to Natsumi Maki in signles competition. During her time in the promotion, she has won two separate titles. First of them is the AWG Tag Team Championship which she won alonsgide Kakeru Sekiguchi at AWG Act In Korakuen Hall on August 13, 2021. The other one is the AgZ Championship, the top title of the company which she won at AWG ACTwrestling In Korakuen Hall on March 12, 2023, by defeating Kouki in the finals of a tournament to win the reactivated title which was previously vacated due to Actwres girl'Z undergoing a rebranding process.

Being a homegrown talent of the promotion, Aono frequently took part in notable events such as the Korakuen Hall event from December 13, 2021, where she teamed up with Kakeru Sekiguchi and Maika Ozaki in a losing effort against Saki, Hikari Shimizu and Yuna Mizumori as a result of a six-woman tag team match.

Ice Ribbon (2019–present)
Another promotion in which Aono is known for competing in is Ice Ribbon. One of her first bouts in the promotion took place at RibbonMania 2019 on December 31, which was Tequila Saya's retirement match, a gauntlet match in which the latter put herself against 44 opponents. Some of the most notable were Aono herself alongside Hiroe Nagahama, Ken Ohka, Manami Toyota, Ram Kaicho, Tsukasa Fujimoto, Tsukushi, Hiragi Kurumi, Syuri, Matsuya Uno and many others. She took part into the 2nd Kizuna Tournament of August 29, 2020, event in which she teamed up with Mochi Miyagi and fell short to Akane Fujita and Asahi in the first rounds.

She eventually started chasing for various titles promoted by the company. At Ice Ribbon New Ice Ribbon #1142 on August 28, 2021, she teamed up with Nao Ishikawa to unsuccessfully challenge Azure Revolution (Maya Yukihi and Risa Sera) for the International Ribbon Tag Team Championship. At Ice Ribbon New Ice Ribbon #1152 on October 17, 2021, she unsuccessfully challenged Rina Shingaki and Satsuki Totoro in a three-way match for the Triangle Ribbon Championship.

Championships and accomplishments
Actwres girl'Z
AgZ Championship (1 time, current)
AWG Tag Team Championship (1 time) – with Kakeru Sekiguchi

References

1990 births
Living people
Japanese female professional wrestlers
21st-century professional wrestlers
People from Saitama Prefecture
Sportspeople from Saitama Prefecture